Reagy Baah Ofosu (born 20 September 1991) is a German professional footballer who plays as a winger for Saudi Arabian club Ohod.

Career
He became the Slovak champion with Spartak Trnava in 2017–18 season.

On 8 January 2023, Ofosu joined Saudi Arabian club Ohod.

Honours
Spartak Trnava
 Slovak Super Liga: 2017–18

Universitatea Craiova
Cupa României: 2020–21
Supercupa României: 2021

References

1991 births
Living people
German sportspeople of Ghanaian descent
German footballers
Footballers from Hamburg
Association football wingers
3. Liga players
Austrian Football Bundesliga players
Eredivisie players
Croatian Football League players
Slovak Super Liga players
Nemzeti Bajnokság I players
Liga I players
TFF First League players
Super League Greece players
Saudi First Division League players
Hamburger SV II players
FC Ingolstadt 04 players
FC Ingolstadt 04 II players
Chemnitzer FC players
SV Grödig players
NEC Nijmegen players
NK Istra 1961 players
FC Spartak Trnava players
Szombathelyi Haladás footballers
FC Botoșani players
CS Universitatea Craiova players
Bursaspor footballers
Ionikos F.C. players
Ohod Club players
German expatriate footballers
German expatriate sportspeople in Austria
Expatriate footballers in Austria
German expatriate sportspeople in the Netherlands
Expatriate footballers in the Netherlands
German expatriate sportspeople in Croatia
Expatriate footballers in Croatia
German expatriate sportspeople in Slovakia
Expatriate footballers in Slovakia
German expatriate sportspeople in Hungary
Expatriate footballers in Hungary
German expatriate sportspeople in Romania
Expatriate footballers in Romania
German expatriate sportspeople in Turkey
Expatriate footballers in Turkey
German expatriate sportspeople in Greece
Expatriate footballers in Greece
German expatriate sportspeople in Saudi Arabia
Expatriate footballers in Saudi Arabia